20 Angosht, released in English-speaking markets as 20 Fingers, is a 2004 Iranian film directed by Mania Akbari. It stars the director herself and producer Bijan Daneshmand as a couple (or possibly different couples) discussing their relationship and arguing in seven vignettes shot in several long takes on a DV camera.

The film deals with controversial topics such as divorce and homosexuality and has not yet received permission to be shown uncut in its native country. It has achieved mild international success, winning Best Digital Film at the 61st Venice International Film Festival in 2004, where it premiered.

Awards
Winner of the Best feature film in Venezia Cinema Digital Section (Venice, Italy - 2004)
The Grand jury prize for the spirit of freedom in Bahamas International Film Festival (Bahamas - 2004) 
Special Mention Femina International Women's Film Festival (Rio de Janeiro, Brazil - 2005)
Winner of Best Director and Best Actress Digital International Barcelona Film Festival (Barcelona, Spain - 2005)
Winner of the Most Innovative film Award Wine Country International Film Festival (California, USA - 2005)

External links

Interview on Bright Lights Film Journal
Review on Iranian.com
Review on Close-Up Film

2000s Persian-language films
2004 drama films
2004 films
Films set in Iran
Iranian drama films